Ankle Hill is a hill located in the centre of Melton Mowbray, in Leicestershire.
In the civil war the town of Melton Mowbray was the theatre of a battle between Sir Marmaduke Langdale's Royalist force of 1,500 men and the Roundhead garrison commanded by Colonel Rossiter which was stationed in the town. The battle took place on a hillside near the present day town centre, and it is said that the blood of the slaughtered Roundheads pooled ankle deep at its base. Thenceforth the hill was known as Ankle Hill, however at some point in history the names of Dalby Road and Ankle Hill were unintentionally swapped in error, however were never changed back.

References

Hills of Leicestershire